Benjamin Anthony Fisk-Routledge (born February 4, 1993) is a Canadian professional soccer player who plays as a left winger for Canadian Premier League club Cavalry FC.

Club career

Vancouver Whitecaps
Fisk played for a host of local clubs before joining Vancouver Whitecaps FC's youth setup in 2006. He made his senior debuts in 2011, playing for the club's under-23 squad.

On April 16, 2013 Fisk was loaned to Charleston Battery until the end of the season. He returned to Whitecaps in August, after scoring twice and assisting to a further three goals in nine appearances, being also called up to the main squad for the 2014 pre-season.

Coruxo
On August 8, 2014 Fisk signed a one-year deal with Spanish Segunda División B side Coruxo FC. He scored his first goals for the club on April 2 of the following year, netting a hat-trick in a 3–1 away win against CD Tropezón.

Deportivo B
On August 11, 2015 Fisk joined Deportivo de La Coruña, being assigned to the reserves in Tercera División. Fisk was released by the club in June 2016 after one year.

FC Edmonton
On July 28, 2016, Fisk signed with FC Edmonton of the North American Soccer League. Fisk would spend two seasons with FC Edmonton, before the club ceased operations after the 2017 season.

Derry City
On June 22, 2018, Fisk signed with Derry City of the League of Ireland Premier Division.

Pacific FC
On February 7, 2019, Fisk returned to Canada, signing with Canadian Premier League club Pacific FC. He made his debut for Pacific in their inaugural game against on April 28 against HFX Wanderers. Fisk scored his first goal for the club on May 18 against York9. In February 2020 Fisk revealed he would not be returning to the team for the 2020 CPL season.

Atlético Ottawa
On March 4, 2020, Fisk joined Atlético Ottawa, becoming the club's first-ever signing. He made his debut in Ottawa's inaugural match on August 15 against York9. He went on to appear in all seven of Ottawa's matches in the shortened 2020 season, and scored a goal in a 2–0 win over Cavalry FC. On February 26, 2021, Fisk was released by the club.

Cavalry FC

2021 
In August 2021, Fisk would sign with fellow CPL club Cavalry FC for the remainder of the 2021 season. In In 20 appearances, Fisk scored 2 goals and 5 assists overall as Cavalry was eliminated in the CPL Playoff semifinals.

2022 
In January 2022, Cavalry announced that they had re-signed Fisk for the 2022 and 2023 seasons, with an option for 2024. In 2022, Cavalry were again considered contenders for the CPL championship. Fisk scored his first goal of the year against Valour FC, a last minute winner to make it 2-1, and celebrated with a cowboy hat thrown down to him from the fans in the stands.

International career
After appearing with the Canada under-20s, Fisk was called up to the main squad for friendlies against Bulgaria and Moldova, but remained as an unused substitute in both matches. He also appeared with the under-23s at the 2015 Pan American Games.

In May 2016, Fisk was called to Canada's U23 national team for a pair of friendlies against Guyana and Grenada. He scored in the match against Guyana.

Personal life
Fisk was born in Vancouver, British Columbia to an English father and a Canadian mother from Nova Scotia.

Career statistics

Club

International

References

External links

Ben Fisk Interview

1993 births
Living people
Association football forwards
Canadian soccer players
Soccer players from Vancouver
Canadian people of English descent
Canadian expatriate soccer players
Expatriate soccer players in the United States
Canadian expatriate sportspeople in the United States
Expatriate footballers in Spain
Canadian expatriate sportspeople in Spain
Expatriate association footballers in Northern Ireland
Canadian expatriate sportspeople in Northern Ireland
Vancouver Whitecaps FC U-23 players
Charleston Battery players
Coruxo FC players
Deportivo Fabril players
FC Edmonton players
Derry City F.C. players
Pacific FC players
Atlético Ottawa players
USL League Two players
USL Championship players
Segunda División B players
North American Soccer League players
League of Ireland players
Canadian Premier League players
Canada men's youth international soccer players
Canada men's under-23 international soccer players
Canada men's international soccer players
Footballers at the 2015 Pan American Games
Pan American Games competitors for Canada